is a Japanese professional footballer who plays as a midfielder for MLS Next Pro club New England Revolution II via the New England Revolution academy.

Career

Youth
Fujiwara joined the New England Revolution academy in 2016. He made his first appearance for the club's USL League One side, New England Revolution II, on 15 August 2020, appearing as a 60th-minute substitute during a 3-3 draw with North Texas SC. In his debut, Fujiwara became the first Revolution Academy player to record a professional assist. He earned his first professional start on 21 August 2020 against Richmond Kickers. Following the 2022 season, his option was declined by New England.

Personal
Fujiwara was born in Obu, Aichi, Japan before moving to Lexington, Massachusetts in the United States when he was 12 years old. His brother, Kaoru, also plays in the New England Revolution academy.

References

2003 births
Association football midfielders
Japanese footballers
Japanese expatriate footballers
Living people
Soccer players from Massachusetts
New England Revolution II players
USL League One players
MLS Next Pro players